Barrington Marquis Rowland (born 8 January 1980) is an Indian former cricketer who played for Karnataka. A right-handed batsman, he has represented Karnataka through all age groups and captained the under-16 side. He  currently lives in New Zealand as a premier Cricket Coach at Eden Roskill Cricket club, Auckland Coaching Director at Western District Cricket Association.

External links

Karnataka cricketers
1980 births
Living people
Indian cricketers
South Zone cricketers
Cricketers from Bangalore